On 8 September 2014, a fire extinguisher bomb exploded in the Escuela Militar metro station in Santiago, Chile, injuring 14 people, several seriously. Though no group or individual has claimed responsibility, the attacks have been attributed to the Chilean Anarchist group, Conspiracy of Cells of Fire.

Background
Since 2005, more than 200 explosive related incidents have been reported to have occurred. In 2009, an improvised explosive device exploded in the bag of a 27-year-old man, killing him instantly.

Since the beginning of 2014, there have been 29 bombs uncovered in Chile. Most of the bombs were filled with gunpowder but did not explode and the few that did, did not cause any injuries. In August, President Michelle Bachelet appointed a special prosecutor to investigate the threat of future bombings.

Santiago has experienced 10 bombings in 2014, and over 200 between 2004 and 2014, with few casualties.  Many of the incidents, which mostly occur at night in empty streets, are claimed by groups giving themselves names associated with anarchism, others may be carried out by anti-American groups, indigenous rights groups, or anti-capitalism groups.  Most of the explosive devices are small, designed to make noise, although capable of injuring or killing.

Attack
The explosion occurred during the lunch hour rush in the subway station. The bomb was a fire extinguisher filled with gunpowder on a timer left inside of a trash can. 14 people were injured including a 61-year-old woman who had to have her finger amputated due to shrapnel damage along with others who were hospitalized due to serious injuries.

Aftermath
After the attack subway service was temporarily stopped but then continued on although the station were the explosion occurred, was closed. The Carabiniers of Chile responded with their bomb squad and special investigators in order to gather evidence and the national government also requested the assistance of foreign security agencies in identifying the bombers. In response to the new attacks, the national government announced that they would be invoking Chile's controversial Anti-terror law which allows for longer detention without charge, the use of wiretaps, and confidential witnesses. The bombing also raised concerns about whether more explosions would occur in the days nearing the anniversary of the dictatorship of Augusto Pinochet. On September 9, the police announced that they had one suspect that had been captured on security footage placing the bomb.

Investigation & arrests 
On 22 September 2014, two men and one woman were arrested in a police raid related to the incident. The suspects identified as Juan Alexis Flores Riquelme, Guillermo Cristóbal Durán Méndez and Nataly Antonieta Casanova Muñoz. According to the authorities gunpowder and other bomb making materials were found in the suspects' homes, with Juan Flores being the mastermind behind the organization. The Public Ministry, through the regional prosecutor of the South Zone, Raúl Guzmán and the prosecutor with exclusive dedication, Christian Toledo,  found a bip! card (a plastic card used as a means of payment to use public transport in Santiago) among the belongings of the accused. Its recorded usage history, along with security camera footage, was used as evidence against the accused.

The suspects were officially charged with the crime on September 23. Despite the evidence presented by the authorities, the suspects denied any involvement in the incident.

On March 15, 2018, the Sixth Oral Criminal Trial Court of Santiago sentenced Juan Flores Riquelme to a total of 23 years in prison as the perpetrator of the terrorist crimes of planting and detonating an explosive device, possession of a bomb, six crimes of less serious injuries and crime of damages. The other two defendants were released due to lack of records that would allow proving the existence of terrorist crimes.

Related incidents
Between 9 and 10 September 2014, two improvised bombs exploded in the Chilean resort town of Vina del Mar. On the night of September 9, a bomb detonated inside a supermarket, injuring one woman. The bomb consisted of a plastic bottle filled with aluminum and hydrochloric acid, was placed inside a trash can. The bomb exploded after the local janitor attempted to empty the trash can. The second device detonated inside the Open Plaza mall's bathroom.

On 25 September 2014, a home made explosive device detonated inside a man's bag while he was carrying it. The victim was later identified as 29-year-old Sergio Landskron Silva. In the aftermath of the explosion Silva remained engulfed in flames while laying on the sidewalk. Bystanders and policemen failed to assist the victim, fearing that a second explosive device remained in his bag. Silva was pronounced dead several minutes after being transferred to a hospital. According to Silva's brother, he has been living on the streets for a prolonged period of time, while struggling with drug addiction. Silva was allegedly planning to plant the bomb in the Yungay neighborhood of Santiago.

Reactions
  – President Michelle Bachelet called the attack "A cowardly act because it has as its objective to hurt people, create fear and even kill innocent people"  The government spokesman, Alvaro Elizalde, called the attack an "act of terrorism" and vowed that the Chilean government would capture those responsible.

See also

Terrorism in Chile
List of terrorist incidents

References

Attacks in South America in 2014
Terrorist incidents in Chile
2014 crimes in Chile
2010s in Santiago, Chile
Crime in Santiago, Chile
September 2014 crimes in South America
Terrorist incidents in South America in 2014